The  Palace of Laeken or Castle of Laeken is the official residence of the King of the Belgians and the Belgian Royal Family.

The palace was built between 1782 and 1784 for the Governors of the Habsburg Netherlands, and was originally named the Palace of Schonenberg. It was partly destroyed by fire in 1890, after which it was rebuilt and extended. Significant modifications were undertaken at the beginning of the 20th century during the reign of King Leopold II. Nowadays, it is often referred to as the Royal Palace of Laeken or Royal Castle of Laeken.

The Palace of Laeken should not be confused with the Royal Palace of Brussels, in central Brussels, which is the official palace (not residence) of the King of the Belgians and from which state affairs are handled. It is served by Stuyvenbergh metro station on line 6 of the Brussels Metro.

History

Origins (–1830)
The palace was built between 1782 and 1784 in Laeken, then a rural village outside Brussels, after the plans of the French architect and urbanist Charles de Wailly, under supervision of the Belgian-Austrian architect Louis Montoyer. It was originally named the Palace of Schonenberg and was to serve as a summer residence for the Governors of the Habsburg Netherlands, Duchess Maria Christina of Austria and her husband Prince Albrecht of Saxony-Teschen. The French cabinetmaker Jean-Joseph Chapuis provided the royal furniture.

On 21 July 1803, Nicolas-Jean Rouppe, the commissioner of the department of the Dyle, received Napoleon at the Palace of Laeken. Napoleon stayed there with the Empress Josephine in August 1804 on his way from awarding the first Légion d'honneur to his troops at Boulogne, to his progress along the Rhine, and later, during the Hundred Days in 1815, prematurely made this proclamation from the palace:

Post-independence (1830–present)
After Belgian Independence, Rouppe, by then mayor of the City of Brussels, received the new King Leopold I at the Palace of Laeken on 21 July 1831, the day of Leopold's coronation. The palace was partly destroyed by fire in 1890, and was rebuilt and extended by the architect Alphonse Balat. The French architect Charles Girault gave it its present outline in 1902, with the addition of two new monumental wings forming a "U" shape with the main facade. The domain also contains the large Royal Greenhouses of Laeken, a set of monumental dome-shaped constructions, accessible to the public only a few days a year. They were also designed by Balat, with the cooperation of the young Victor Horta.

The Palace of Laeken has been the royal residence since Leopold I's accession to the throne in 1831. However, upon their accession to the throne in 1993, King Albert II and Queen Paola preferred to remain living in the Belvédère, a château on the grounds of the park surrounding the palace. The current occupants of the palace are King Philippe, Queen Mathilde and their four children.

Royal Domain

The gardens are surrounded by walls and iron gates, and are closed to the public, although there have been calls for the king to open at least a portion of the park for public use amid the COVID-19 pandemic in Belgium.

The gardens of the Royal Domain are landscaped in English style; the vast park includes lakes, a golf course and artworks. King Leopold II was very closely connected with the designs of his private gardens. It is in these gardens that his only son, Prince Leopold, Duke of Brabant, fell in a pond, and died subsequently from pneumonia, aged only nine. The king had trees planted for his new-born children, which still stand in the park.

There are various pavilions, including the Chinese Pavilion and the Japanese Tower. They were commissioned by Leopold II and now form part of the Museums of the Far East. The rooms of the Chinese Pavilion are designed in  chinoiserie Louis XIV and Louis XVI styles. They are decorated with Chinese motifs, chinaware and silverware. The Japanese Tower is a pagoda, inspired by a construction Leopold saw at the Paris Exposition of 1900. Leopold thus asked his architect Alexandre Marcel to build him a similar one in Laeken.

In the gardens live several colonies of wild Canada geese, hundreds of cormorants and other large birds. The gardens are also home to one of the biggest colonies of herons in the country.

Royal Greenhouses

The Royal Greenhouses of Laeken are located within the Royal Domain and are attached to the palace via the orangery. They were commissioned by King Leopold II and designed and built between 1874 and 1895 by Alphonse Balat. The main greenhouses, such as the Congo Greenhouse and the so-called Iron Church, a domed greenhouse, which would originally serve as the royal chapel, are all linked by flowered corridors spanning hundreds of meters.

The complex is home to the famous Royal Botanic Collection, which includes large collections of camellias, orange trees and many plants originating from the African parts of the former Belgian Empire. Many sculptures and Chinese vases can also be found within the greenhouses.

Modern-day function

The Palace of Laeken is mainly a residential palace and has a more sober and intimate character than the Royal Palace of Brussels. Since 1999, it has been the residence of King Philippe and Queen Mathilde with their family.

The Royal Greenhouses of Laeken are open to the public for three weeks each year during the flowering period, in April–May. The palace is known for its stables, the Chinese pavilion and the Japanese Tower. The painting studio of Elisabeth of Bavaria, Queen of Belgium, can also be admired.

At the request of Queen Paola, the play pavilion in which the children of King Leopold III grew up has been restored, so that Crown Princess Elisabeth, Duchess of Brabant could play there with her siblings and cousins.

Influence
Mobutu Sese Seko, the dictator of Zaire (the modern-day Democratic Republic of the Congo), built a palace in his hometown of Gbadolite modelled upon the Royal Palace of Laeken.

See also
 List of castles and châteaux in Belgium
 Royal Trust (Belgium)
 Neoclassical architecture in Belgium
 History of Brussels
 Belgium in "the long nineteenth century"

References

Notes

Bibliography

External links

 The Royal Castle of Laeken at Visit Brussels

Castles in Brussels
Palaces in Brussels
City of Brussels
Royal residences in Belgium
Houses completed in 1784
Neoclassical architecture in Belgium
Continental gardens in the English Landscape Garden style